Eisenberg Castle (German: Burg Eisenberg) is a ruin near the German town of Korbach in Hesse.

The castle was founded in the 14th century, however the names of the founders are no longer known. In the 15th century the castle was acquired by the House of Waldeck. From 1487 on the castle was inhabited by the Eisenberg-branch of the House of Waldeck. This continued until the extinction of Eisenberg-branch in 1692.

Ruined castles in Germany
Castles in Hesse
Principality of Waldeck and Pyrmont